Joseph Mahn Erie (18 March 1925 – 25 October 2017) was a Roman Catholic bishop.

Ordained to the priesthood in 1951, Mahn Erie served as bishop of the Roman Catholic Diocese of Bassein, Myanmar, from 1968 until 1982.

See also
Catholic Church in Burma

Notes

1925 births
2017 deaths
20th-century Roman Catholic bishops in Myanmar